Dastgerd-e Mehr Avaran (also Romanized as Dastgerd-e Mehr Āvarān; also known as Dastgerd and Dastjerd-e Mehr Āvarān) is a village in Garkan Rural District, Garkan-e Jonubi District, Mobarakeh County, Isfahan Province, Iran. At the 2006 census, its population was 1,004, in 273 families.

References 

Populated places in Mobarakeh County